Nishantha Ranatunga (born 22 January 1966) is a former Sri Lankan cricketer who played two One Day Internationals in 1993. An all-rounder of note in domestic cricket, he is the brother of former Sri Lanka captain Arjuna Ranatunga, Sanjeeva Ranatunga, Dammika Ranatunga and Prasanna Ranatunga.

After cricket
Ranatunga was the former honorable secretary of Sri Lanka Cricket, the governing body of cricket in Sri Lanka.

He also served as the secretary of the government-appointed interim-committee that was in charge of the cricket board when stadiums were built and renovated for the ICC Cricket World Cup 2011.

Ranatunga was previously appointed by the UPFA government as the director general of the state-owned Sri Lanka Rupavahini Corporation.

In January, 2012, he was elected uncontested as the secretary of the cricket board.

There has been a lot of controversy over Ranatunga's role as CEO of a television channel, which is owned by president Mahinda Rajapaksa's family, that the cricket board awarded broadcast rights to. Critics say that Ranatunga's role as the CEO of Carlton Sports Network while being the secretary at Sri Lanka Cricket is a conflict of interest.

Now he is serving as the Chairman of National Water Supply and Drainage Board since 2019 December

References

External links

Cricinfo article on Nishantha Ranatunga
Articles, videos and photos on Nishantha Ranatunga

1966 births
Basnahira North cricketers
Basnahira South cricketers
Kandurata cricketers
Living people
Prisoners and detainees of Sri Lanka
Sinhalese Sports Club cricketers
Sri Lankan cricket administrators
Sri Lankan cricketers
Sri Lankan prisoners and detainees
Sri Lanka One Day International cricketers